Rıza Tuyuran (born 25 August 1960) is a retired Turkish football midfielder and later manager.

References

1960 births
Living people
Turkish football managers
Karşıyaka S.K. managers
Göztepe S.K. managers